Teeder Wynne (born December 6, 1973) is a Canadian former ice hockey forward who was an All-American for North Dakota.

Career
Wynne began attending the University of North Dakota in the fall of 1992. He saw little playing time as a freshman, providing minimal scoring for a team that won less than a third of its games. While his production improved as a sophomore, the team remained mired at the bottom of the WCHA. Dean Blais was brought in as head coach in 1994 and Wynne saw a dramatic increase to his game. He scored 30 more points as a junior, leading the team with 49 and helping the Fighting Sioux get back to .500. In his final season with North Dakota, Wynne continued his upward trend, finishing in the top 10 in the nation in scoring. UND posted its first winning season in five years while Wynne was named to the All-American team.

After graduation, Wynne went to Europe to play professionally. over the next seven seasons, Wynne played on five different teams in four countries. He typically produced at least a point per game over the course of a season and averaged two points per game three times. In 2002 he helped the Dundee Stars win the British National League championship, scoring nearly three points per game in their playoff run. Wynne played one season after the title before retiring as a player.

Personal life
Teeder's older brother John played college hockey at Waterloo. The two played together in Europe from 1996 through 1999.

Statistics

Regular season and playoffs

Awards and honors

References

External links

1973 births
Living people
AHCA Division I men's ice hockey All-Americans
Asiago Hockey 1935 players
Ayr Scottish Eagles players
Canadian ice hockey forwards
Dundee Stars players
North Dakota Fighting Hawks men's ice hockey players
Nybro Vikings players
Sheffield Steelers players
Ice hockey people from Calgary
Canadian expatriate ice hockey players in Sweden
Canadian expatriate ice hockey players in Italy
Canadian expatriate ice hockey players in the United States
Canadian expatriate ice hockey players in Scotland
Canadian expatriate ice hockey players in England